DU-41164, also known as 1,2β-methylene-6-fluoro-17α-acetoxy-δ6-retroprogesterone, is a progestin which was developed by Philips-Duphar in the 1970s and was never marketed. It is a combined derivative of 17α-hydroxyprogesterone and retroprogesterone. The drug shows extremely high potency as a progestogen in animals; it was reported to possess 500 times the affinity of progesterone for the progesterone receptor expressed in rabbit uterus (Ki = 0.87 pM and 0.41 nM, respectively), and showed 600 times the progestogenic potency of subcutaneous progesterone when given orally in animals. The affinity of DU-41164 for the progesterone receptor was described in 1974 as "probably the highest reported for any steroid-receptor interaction". The drug showed no androgenic, anabolic, antiandrogenic, estrogenic, or corticosteroid activity in animals. Although highly potent in animals, DU-41164 produced little or no progestogenic effect at dosages of 50 and 200 µg/day in women, suggesting major species differences. A closely related compound, DU-41165, has been developed as a photoaffinity label for the progesterone receptor.

References

Abandoned drugs
Acetate esters
Diketones
Fluoroarenes
Pregnanes
Progestogens
Enones
Conjugated dienes